The Great Plains skink (Plestiodon obsoletus) is a species of lizard endemic to North America.

Description
The Great Plains skink, together with the broad-headed skink, is the largest skink of the genus Plestiodon.  It reaches a length of 9 to 13 cm from snout to vent (SVL) or up to nearly 34 cm total length (including the tail).

This lizard is light gray or beige in color; its dorsal scales have black or dark brown edges.  The scales on the sides run diagonally.  The belly is yellow. Juveniles are black with white sports on the lips and the head and have a blue or bluish tail.

Geographic range
The Great Plains skink is very common on the Great Plains, ranging from southeastern Wyoming and Nebraska (and also Fremont County, Iowa) southward to eastern Arizona, New Mexico, Texas, and into Mexico.

Habitat
This skink lives in open plains habitat or the eastern foothills of the Rocky Mountains, in areas near water, e.g. irrigation ditches.  In southeastern Colorado, it occurs in elevation up to about 1900 m (7200 ft); in northern Colorado, only at elevations below about 1400 m (4500 ft).

Reproduction
The mating season of the Great Plains skink is in April or May.  The female lays between 5 and 32 eggs (on the average about 12) in early summer, which she guards until they hatch in late summer.

References

Further reading
Baird, S.F., and C.F. Girard. 1852. Characteristics of some New Reptiles in the Museum of the Smithsonian Institution. Second Part. Proc. Acad. Nat. Sci. Philadelphia 6: 125-129. (Plestiodon obsoletum, p. 129.)
Behler, J.L., and F.W. King. 1979. The Audubon Society Field Guide to North American Reptiles and Amphibians. Knopf. New York. 743 pp. . (Eumeces obsoletus, p. 575 + Plate 432.)
Boulenger, G.A. 1887. Catalogue of the Lizards in the British Museum (Natural History). Second Edition. Volume III. Lacertidæ, Gerrhosauridæ, Scincidæ,... Trustees of the British Museum (Natural History). (Taylor and Francis, printers.) London. xii + 575 pp. + Plates I. XL. (Eumeces obsoletus, p. 374.)
Conant, R. 1975. A Field Guide to Reptiles and Amphibians of Eastern and Central North America, Second Edition. Houghton Mifflin. Boston. xviii + 429 pp.  (hardcover),  (paperback). (Eumeces obsoletus, p. 125, Figure 28 + Plate 19 + Map 79.)
Smith, H.M., and E.D. Brodie Jr. 1982. Reptiles of North America: A Guide to Field Identification. Golden Press. New York. 240 pp. . (Eumeces obsoletus, pp. 80–81.)
Stebbins, R.C. 2003. A Field Guide to Western Reptiles and Amphibians, Third Edition. The Peterson Field Guide Series ®. Houghton Mifflin. Boston and New York. xiii + 533 pp. . (Eumeces obsoletus, pp. 310–311 + Plate 36 + Map 109.)

External links 

 Great Plains Skink, on Reptiles and Amphibians of Iowa

Plestiodon
Reptiles of Mexico
Reptiles of the United States
Fauna of the Great Plains
Fauna of the Plains-Midwest (United States)
Fauna of the Southwestern United States
Reptiles described in 1852
Taxa named by Spencer Fullerton Baird
Taxa named by Charles Frédéric Girard